Wissingen is a railway station located in Wissingen, municipality Bissendorf, Germany. The station is located on the Löhne-Rheine railway. The train services are operated by WestfalenBahn.

Train services
The following services currently call at Wissingen:
Wiehengebirgs-Bahn Bad Bentheim - Rheine - Osnabrück - Herford - Bielefeld

References

Railway stations in Lower Saxony